Ivan Vsevolodovich Meshchersky (1859–1935) was a Russian mathematician who gained fame for his work on mechanics, notably the motion of bodies of variable mass.

Biography
Ivan Vsevolodovich Meshcherskiy was born in Arkhangelsk. After graduation from Arkhangelsk Gymnasium, Meshcherskiy studied mathematics at the Saint Petersburg Imperial University from 1878 to 1882.

References

1859 births
1935 deaths
Russian mathematicians
Soviet mathematicians
Burials at Bogoslovskoe Cemetery
People from Arkhangelsk